Mas, Más or MAS may refer to:

Film and TV
 Más y Menos, fictional superhero characters, from the Teen Titans animated television series
 "Más" (Breaking Bad), a season three episode of Breaking Bad

Songs
 Más (album), by Spanish singer Alejandro Sanz
 "Más", by José José from the 1985 album Promesas
 "Más", by Kinky from their 2002 album Kinky
 "Más" (Nelly Furtado song), from her 2009 album Mi Plan
 "Más" (Ricky Martin song), from his 2011 album Música + Alma + Sexo
 "Más", by Selena Gómez from her 2014 album For You
 "+" (song), Aitana and Cali y El Dandee from her 2019 album 11 Razones

Computing
 MAS 90, Sage accounting software
 Motu Audio System, now Digital Performer, audio sequencer software
 Multi-agent system, built of multiple interacting agents
 Malware Analysis System by FireEye

Education
 Master of Advanced Studies, an academic degree
 Master of Advanced Study, a professional degree
 Master of Applied Science, a professional degree
 Master of Archival Studies, a professional degree
 Master of Aeronautical Science, an academic degree
 Mescalero Apache Schools
 Macarthur Anglican School

Military
 MAS (boat), Italian motor torpedo boats
 Manufacture d'armes de Saint-Étienne, a French government arms factory
 MAS-49 rifle, a French semiautomatic rifle manufactured by them

Organizations
 Malaysia Airlines, flag carrier of Malaysia
 Muerte a Secuestradores (Death to Kidnappers), a Colombian paramilitary group
 Football Association of Malaysia, by FIFA report code
 Mongolian Academy of Sciences, a Mongolian college
 Municipal Art Society, an urban planning organization based in New York City
 Muslim American Society, an Islamic revival and reform movement
 Macarthur Astronomical Society, a non-profit organization based in Sydney, Australia
 Maghreb Association Sportive de Fès, a Moroccan football club colloquially referred to by the acronym MAS
 Monetary Authority of Singapore, Singapore's central bank
 Museum aan de Stroom, museum in the city of Antwerp
 Museo de Arte Moderno y Contemporáneo de Santander y Cantabria, art museum in Santander, Spain
 Mujeres en Acción Solidaria, a Mexican feminist organization

Places
 Mas de las Matas, Aragón, Spain
 Mas (Provençal farmhouse)
 Mas (restaurant), New York City

Politics
 Movement for Socialism (Argentina) (Movimiento al Socialismo), an Argentine political party
 Mouvement pour une Alternative Socialiste (Movement for a Socialist Alternative), a Belgian Trotskyist organization
 Movement toward Socialism (Bolivia) (Movimiento al Socialismo), a Bolivian political party
 Broad Social Movement (Movimiento Amplio Social), a Chilean political party
 Socialist Alternative Movement (Movimento Alternativa Socialista), a Portuguese Trotskyist political party
 Movement toward Socialism (Venezuela) (Movimiento al Socialismo), a Venezuelan political party

Biology
 Macrophage activation syndrome, a potentially life-threatening complication of several chronic rheumatic diseases of childhood
 The G protein-coupled receptor Mas, a critical part of the renin–angiotensin–aldosterone system (RAAS), encoded by the proto-oncogene MAS1
 Mandibular advancement splint, a device used to treat sleep apnea
 Marker assisted selection, a genome-tagging technique
 Meconium aspiration syndrome, neonatal aspiration of meconium
 McCune–Albright syndrome, a genetic disorder which results in precocious puberty
 Mixed amphetamine salts, an abridged generic name for Adderall, a stimulant drug

Metrics
 Milliampere second (mAs), a fraction of an ampere hour, a unit of electric charge
 Milliarcseconds (mas), a unit of angular measurement
 Magic angle spinning, a technique used in solid state nuclear magnetic resonance spectroscopy

Transport
 Chennai Central railway station, code MAS

People
 Mas (surname), a surname
 Mas (Swedish term)
 MAS (band)
 Marco Antonio Solis, name abbreviation

Other uses
 Malaysia, IOC country code
 Marshall Islands, UNDP country code
 Mas, short for masquerade, traditional Carnival costumes; see List of Trinidad and Tobago Carnival character costumes

See also

 
 Mezzi d'Assalto, (Assault Vehicle), in the unit name Decima Flottiglia MAS
Xmas (disambiguation)